Duplapex is an extinct genus of bivalved arthropod known from the Cambrian Stage 3 aged Qingjiang biota of Hubei, China, with a single species. D. anima. It is thought to be a close relative of Tuzoia, but unlike it, the reticulated (net patterned) bivalved carapace was interpreted to have opened at a wide angle. The carapace had a pair of spines projecting posteriorly. In its original description, it was suggested to have eyes on annulated stalks, but later research suggested that these may have been preservational artifacts instead.

References 

Cambrian arthropods
Hymenocarina